The Atomic Fireman (Spanish: El bombero atómico) is a 1952 Mexican comedy film directed by Miguel M. Delgado and starring Cantinflas, Roberto Soto and Gilberto González. The film's art direction was by Gunther Gerszo.

Plot
A newspaper delivery man-turned-firefighter-turned-policeman (Cantinflas) embarks on the unexpected mission of caring for a girl whose mother died.

Cast
 Cantinflas as Agente 777 
 Roberto Soto as Comandante Bravo 
 Gilberto González as El Piquete  
 Elisa Quintanilla as Rosario  
 Miguel Manzano as Jefe bomberos  
 Pascual García Peña as El Chueco  
 Ernesto Finance as Licenciado / notario  
 Jorge Mondragon as Silverio  
 Eduardo Alcaraz as Sargento Policía  
 Ángel Infante as Policía  
 Pedro Elviro as Secretario (uncredited)
 Conchita Gentil Arcos as Vecina de Guadalupe (uncredited)
 María Gentil Arcos as Doña Cleofas (uncredited)
 Salvador Quiroz as Comandante Cienfuegos (uncredited)
 Lily Aclemar as Sra. del comandante Bravo (uncredited)
 Daniel Arroyo as Hombre entre multitud (uncredited)
 Stephen Berne asHombre en cantina (uncredited)
 Enrique Carrillo as Bombero (uncredited)
 José Chávez as Policía (uncredited)
 María Luisa Cortés as La tosferina (uncredited)
 Enrique del Castillo as Policía (uncredited)
 José Luis Fernández as Hombre que baila en cabaret (uncredited)
 Rogelio Fernández as Esbirro de El Piquete (uncredited)
 Lidia Franco as Doña Guadalupe (uncredited)
 Pedro Ibarra as Dueño de La Motivosa (uncredited)
 Margarito Luna as Esbirro de El Piquete (uncredited)
 Carmen Manzano as Mamá de Rosario (uncredited)
 Álvaro Matute as Jugador de cartas (uncredited)
 Kika Meyer as La soplona (uncredited)
 Bruno Márquez as Policía (uncredited)
 Luz María Núñez as La Motivosa (uncredited)
 Casimiro Ortega as Cantinero (uncredited)
 Ramón Pandal as Luciano Tronquete, el influyente (uncredited)
 Ignacio Peón as Juez (uncredited)
 Carlos Valadez as El Chueco (uncredited)

References

Bibliography 
 Ilan Stavans. The Riddle of Cantinflas: Essays on Hispanic Popular Culture, Revised and Expanded Edition. UNM Press, 2012.

External links 
 

1952 films
1952 comedy films
Mexican comedy films
1950s Spanish-language films
Films directed by Miguel M. Delgado
Mexican black-and-white films
1950s Mexican films